David Henry Drummond (11 February 1890–13 June 1965) was an Australian politician and farmer. He was a member of the Country Party and served in both the New South Wales Legislative Assembly (1920–1949) and the Australian House of Representatives (1949–1963).

Early life
Drummond was born in Lewisham, Sydney and was educated at public schools and at The Scots College, but was forced by financial problems to seek work.  In 1902, he became a ward of the state.  He moved to Armidale in 1907 as a farm-hand and in 1913 he married Pearl Hilda Victoria Goode, daughter of a grazier in Uralla.

State politics 

Drummond was elected as a member of the New South Wales Legislative Assembly in 1920, representing Northern Tablelands for the Progressive Party, which in due course became the Country Party; and from 1927 to 1949 he was the member for Armidale.  He was a foundation member of the New England New State Movement.  He was Minister for Education from 1927 to 1930 and 1932 to 1941.  He established the Armidale Teachers College in the 1930s and helped establish the University of New England in 1937.

Federal politics 

In 1949, Drummond switched to federal politics and was elected to the House of Representatives seat of New England. Drummond retired in 1963 and died in Armidale in 1965.

References

Drummond's Publications 

 

1890 births
1965 deaths
Members of the Australian House of Representatives
Members of the Australian House of Representatives for New England
Members of the New South Wales Legislative Assembly
National Party of Australia members of the Parliament of New South Wales
National Party of Australia members of the Parliament of Australia
People educated at Scots College (Sydney)
20th-century Australian politicians
People from Armidale